Shen Teng (born 23 October 1979) is a Chinese comedian, actor and director.

Biography 
Shen Teng was born in Qiqihar, Heilongjiang, China in 1979. He attended the People's Liberation Army Academy of Art in 1999 and received a bachelor's degree in 2003.
 
One of the most popular comedians in China, Shen has performed on CCTV's several New Year Galas and played the leading role in the film Goodbye Mr. Loser in 2015, which was his breakout film role.  Since then, he has starred in films such as Hello Mr. Billionaire and Pegasus.

In 2020, He ranked 28th on Forbes China Celebrity 100 list.

Personal life 
Shen married actress Wang Qi in March 2016, after 12 years of love. Their son was born in August 2018.

Filmography

Film

Television

Awards and nominations

References

External links
 

1979 births
Living people
People from Qiqihar
People's Liberation Army Academy of Art alumni
Chinese filmmakers
Chinese male film actors
Chinese male voice actors
Male actors from Heilongjiang
Chinese male television actors
Film directors from Heilongjiang
21st-century Chinese male actors